Tiago Manuel Oliveira Mesquita (born 23 November 1990) is a Portuguese professional footballer who plays for Académico de Viseu F.C. as a right-back.

Club career
Mesquita was born in Ribeirão, Vila Nova de Famalicão. After emerging through C.D. Trofense's youth academy, he made his professional debut with hometown side G.D. Ribeirão in the 2007–08 season, in the third division.

In the summer of 2009, having appeared in only 16 matches with the main squad over the course of two seasons, Mesquita signed – not yet aged 19 – with Deportivo Alavés in Spain, playing in the same level. In his first year, he took part in less than half of the league matches as the Basques failed to regain their lost status of the previous campaign.

Mesquita returned to his country in the 2011 off-season, joining Associação Naval 1º de Maio of division two. Two years later, he signed with his very first club Trofense in the same tier, and he split 2014–15 between the second and third divisions, with Ribeirão and S.C. Freamunde.

On 17 June 2015, Mesquita moved to Boavista FC. He made his Primeira Liga debut on 20 September, playing the full 90 minutes of a 2–0 away win against Académica de Coimbra. Three years later, he joined C.D. Feirense of the same league on a two-year contract.

References

External links

1990 births
Living people
People from Vila Nova de Famalicão
Sportspeople from Braga District
Portuguese footballers
Association football defenders
Primeira Liga players
Liga Portugal 2 players
Segunda Divisão players
G.D. Ribeirão players
Associação Naval 1º de Maio players
C.D. Trofense players
S.C. Freamunde players
Boavista F.C. players
C.D. Feirense players
Académico de Viseu F.C. players
Segunda División B players
Deportivo Alavés players
Portugal youth international footballers
Portuguese expatriate footballers
Expatriate footballers in Spain
Portuguese expatriate sportspeople in Spain